The Department of Mental Hygiene (DMH) is a component of the New York state government composed of three autonomous offices:

the Office of Addiction  Services and Supports (OASAS)
the Office of Mental Health (OMH)
the Office for People With Developmental Disabilities (OPWDD)

These offices are headed up by a commissioner who also serves on a council that performs inter-office coordination. Their regulations are compiled in title 14 of the New York Codes, Rules and Regulations.

Mental health
The majority of the public mental health system is in voluntary outpatient programs, the largest and most used being clinic treatment services. Inpatient care is provided mainly by state psychiatric centers, supplemented by homeless shelters, the general hospital network, and jails. 45–57% of New York mental health consumers use Medicaid, which is the largest single source of funding.

The Office of Mental Health (OMH) is responsible for assuring the development of comprehensive plans, programs, and services in the areas of research, prevention, and care, treatment, rehabilitation, education, and training of the mentally ill. Programs include inpatient, outpatient, partial hospitalization, day care, emergency, and rehabilitative treatments and services. The OMH also regulates residential treatment facilities for children and youth operated by nonprofit corporations. The hospitals in the department are listed below; the New York State Psychiatric Institute and Nathan Kline Institute for Psychiatric Research are medical research institutes.

OMH provides funding for eligible workforce development initiatives of licensed providers. Funding comes from federal Community Mental Health Services Block Grants and the enhanced Federal Medical Assistance Percentages program, more recently from e.g. the CRRSAA and American Rescue Plan Act of 2021 (COVID-19 stimuli packages), for targeted rate increases and recruitment and retention funds. Many essential workers are still earning far below a living wage even after the COVID-19 pandemic. The New York State Incident Management and Reporting System (NIMRS) is used by providers for reportable incidents.

The Behavioral Health Services Advisory Council (BHSAC) is responsible for reviewing, monitoring, and evaluating the adequacy of services.

History
The department was founded in 1926 with the original name being Office of mental hygiene; as part of a restructuring of the New York state government, and was given responsibility for people diagnosed with mental retardation, mental illness or epilepsy. Dr. Frederick W. Parsons was appointed the first department commissioner in January, 1927. He was replaced by Dr. William J. Tiffany in 1937, who then resigned in 1943 over an investigation into handling of an outbreak of amoebic dysentery at Creedmoor State Hospital. By 1950, the department had grown into the largest agency of the New York state government, with more than 24,000 employees and an operating cost exceeding a third of the state budget. The state acceded to the Interstate Compact on Mental Health in 1956.

The Office of Alcoholism and Substance Abuse was transferred from the New York State Department of Health to the Department of Mental Hygiene in 1962. In 1972 the Mental Hygiene Law was revised and reenacted. In 1978, the Department of Mental Hygiene was reorganized into the autonomous Office of Mental Health (OMH), Office of Alcoholism and Substance Abuse, and the Office of Mental Retardation and Developmental Disabilities (OMRDD). These three offices are headed up by a commissioner who also serves on a council that performs inter-office coordination. In 2010 the OMRDD became the Office for People With Developmental Disabilities (OPWDD). In 2019 the Office of Alcoholism and Substance Abuse became the Office of Addiction Services and Supports (OASAS).

Commissioners
DMH
 1927–1937, Frederick W. Parsons
 1937–1943, William J. Tiffany
 1943–1950, Frederick MacCurdy
 1950–1954, Newton Bigelow
 1955–1964, Paul H. Hoch
 1966–1974, Alan D. Miller
 1975–1978, Lawrence C. Kolb
OMH
 1978, James A. Prevost
 1983, Stephen Katz
 1988,  Richard C. Surles
 1995, James Stone
 2007, Michael Hogan 
 2014, Ann Marie T. Sullivan 
OPWDD
 1975 (1978), Thomas Coughlin III (initially as Deputy Commissioner for Mental Retardation)
 1980, James E Introne
 1982, Zymond L. Slezak
 1983, Arthur Y. Webb
 1990, Elin M. Howe
 1993, Thomas A. Maul
 2007, Diana Jones Ritter
 2011, Courtney E. Burke
 2013, Laurie Kelley
 2014 - 2018, Kerry Delaney (acting)
 2019, Theodore A. Kastner
 2021, Kerri E. Neifeld
OASAS
 1990 (1992), Marguerite Saunders (initially as Director of the Division of Alcoholism and Alcohol Abuse)
 1996, Jean Somers Miller
 2004, William Gorman
 2007, Karen Carpenter-Palumbo
 2011, Arlene González-Sánchez
 2021, Chinazo Cunningham

See also
 New York State Department of Health
 New York City Department of Health and Mental Hygiene

References

Further reading

External links
 New York State Office of Mental Health (OMH)
 Office of Mental Health on DATA.NY.GOV
 New York State Office of Mental Health recipient profile on USAspending.gov
 Office of Mental Health contracts on Open Book New York from the NYS Department of Audit and Control
 New York State Office of Addiction Services and Supports (OASAS)
 Office of Addiction Services and Supports on DATA.NY.GOV
 New York State Office for People With Developmental Disabilities (OPWDD)
 Office for People With Developmental Disabilities on DATA.NY.GOV
 Department of Mental Hygiene in the New York Codes, Rules and Regulations (NYCRR)

New York (state) government departments
State law enforcement agencies of New York (state)
Mental health organizations in New York (state)
1927 establishments in New York (state)
Government agencies established in 1927
State departments of health of the United States
New York State Department of Mental Hygiene